Five.Bolt.Main was an American nu metal band from Louisville, Kentucky.

History

Debut album and live albums (2004–2007)

On October 10, 2006, Rock Ridge released Live, which was recorded in Louisville during their 2006 tour.

Unreleased material, reunion and break up (2007–present)
Plans to release a compilation, titled Complete, were in the works, though no substantive new material had been recorded by the band except the pre-production demos of the songs "Just My Luck" and "Blackout" that were co-produced by Chris Henderson, guitarist of 3 Doors Down, in his recording studio in Biloxi, Mississippi. Regardless, Rock Ridge released Complete in 2008 despite the fact that most members of the band had not consented to its release, citing poor sound quality.

On February 28, 2007, a press release from Rock Ridge Music stated that Five.Bolt.Main had disbanded, and Chris Volz would release a solo album in the fall of 2007.

Discography

Compilation albums
 Live (2006)
 Complete (2008)

Singles

References

External links
  (archive)
 Five.Bolt.Main on MySpace
 
 

Musical groups from Louisville, Kentucky
Musical groups established in 2004
American nu metal musical groups
American alternative metal musical groups
Musical groups disestablished in 2007
Rock Ridge Music artists
2004 establishments in Kentucky